Travis Tatum Mills (born April 12, 1989), previously known by his stage name T. Mills, is an American rapper, singer, and actor from Riverside, California. Following his name change from T. Mills to Travis Mills, he began hosting an eponymous show on Apple Music 1.

Early life 
Travis Tatum Mills was born on April 12, 1989 in Riverside, California. At the age of 5, Mills' uncle gave him his first guitar and at the age of 15 Mills stopped playing sports to start a punk rock band.

Career

2008–2010: Career beginnings and Ready, Fire, Aim! 
At the age of 17, Mills began writing songs in his bedroom, using music software such as Apple's Garage Band. At the age of 18, Mills began posting some of his music on his Myspace page. In 2008, Mills signed a deal to the indie record label Uprising Records.

2011–2012: Signing to Columbia Records, Leaving Home and MtvU's Woodie Awards 

In 2011, Mills signed a deal to Columbia Records, following him signing a deal, he began recording his second and first major-label album. On July 22, 2011, Mills released a mixtape, titled Leaving Home. Leaving Home is a 10-track project, with no guest appearances, while the production was provided from Noel Zancalla, Omen, AudioBlack, The Futuristics, Colin Munroe and Phonix, among others. On December 6, 2011, Mills announced that he would be repackaged as a 5-track EP, under its same name as his mixtape through Columbia Records. The EP's lead single, called "Vans On" was released on December 12, 2011, along with the promotional single, called "The Boom". The EP was made available for retail stores on December 13, 2011. On December 15, 2011, to promote the release of the EP, he performed at The Roxy Show in Los Angeles, California. The EP was released for free on December 19, 2011, The EP was officially released on January 13, 2012, featuring some added new tracks, while the additional production was provided from Sir Nolan and The Stereotypes, among others.

In March 2012, Mills was nominated for the Best New Artist at the MtvU's Woodie Awards. On July 23, 2012, Mills released his second mixtape, called Thrillionaire. It contains 10 tracks, featuring three guest appearances from American rapper Smoke DZA, the hip hop duo Audio Push, and an American musician James Fauntleroy II; as well as the production from Sledgren, The Monsters & Strangerz and Kane Beatz, among others. To promote the mixtape release, Mills filmed some music videos for songs such as "Lightweight", "Diemonds" and "Other Bitch Callin'" featuring James Fauntleroy II. Mills later announced that he is planning on releasing the sequel for his second mixtape, called Thrillionaire 2.

2013–2015: SummerFest and All I Wanna Do 

In 2013, Mills announced that the release date for his second major-label album has been slated for the second quarter of 2013. It was reported that Mills was working on his second major-label album with artists such as Juicy J, Mike Posner, James Fauntleroy, Travis Barker, Layzie Bone and Skeme, with the production by Mills himself, alongside several other record producers such as Kane Beatz, 1500 or Nothin', Malay and Boi-1da, among others. On February 15, 2013, Mills announced that his first single for his second major-label album will be coming soon. On March 5, 2013, the audio for his song, called "Loud" was released for digital download. The following day, Mills released the music video for "Loud". The song was produced by Pop Wansel, and the song contains a sample of "I Know You Got Soul" performed by Eric B. and Rakim. He later said that "the hook for the song was one of his favorites out of all the hooks, he has ever written".

In April 2013, Mills was touring with a fellow American rapper Sammy Adams. On June 27, 2013, Mills was featured on Mike Posner's remix to "We Own It (Fast & Furious)", along with Sammy Adams and Niykee Heaton. In June 2013, Mills was on tour with We the Kings, and the fellow supporting acts The Ready Set and Breathe Carolina on the 2013's SummerFest. The music video for the single, called "All I Wanna Do", was shot and filmed in July 2013.

On February 18, 2014, Mills announced the release to his third EP, titled All I Wanna Do. Starting from February 24 to April 24, 2014, Mills will be headlining on his All I Wanna Do Tour. On February 24, 2014, while starting his promotional tour for his third EP, Mills released the audio to its title track "All I Wanna Do". The following day, Mills officially released the All I Wanna Do EP, via iTunes. The EP features production from Boi-1da and Malay, among others. In July 2015, Mills would change his stage name to his artistic name Travis Mills. On July 24, 2015, Travis released his new single, titled "Young & Stupid". The song features guest verse an fellow American rapper T.I.

2016–present: Signing to First Access Entertainment, While You Wait and Girlfriends 
On January 22, 2016, Travis announced the release of his new single, called "Don't Need Much". The song was released through Republic Records, which was made available for streaming on SoundCloud on the same day of release. The beat from "Don't Need Much" was sampled from a single named "Drank & Drugs", performed by Dutch rappers Lil' Kleine and Ronnie Flex. Travis signed a new label deal with First Access Entertainment and released his fourth EP under the label, titled While You Wait on April 8, 2016. The EP contains six tracks. Travis walked in the New York and Paris fashion shows in July 2016, and was named one of the best dressed by GQ Magazine.

In 2020, Mills formed the band Girlfriends with Nick Gross, with the duo citing Blink-182, 5 Seconds of Summer and All Time Low as the band's musical influences. The band released their first self-titled album on October 23, 2020 featuring 14 tracks. The production led by John Feldmann was a success with almost 20 songs being written in a few months. The band's second album, (E)motion Sickness, was released on June 17, 2022.

Musical style 
Mills' music has been described as genre-blending due to his mix of singing and rapping, being mostly labeled as a hip hop and synthpop artist. He is known for mixing pop and electronic songs with hip hop and R&B. Mills says that his genre-blending music is a result of his exposure to many different genres during childhood. He has said that "[my] mom was a huge Queen fan, my dad's a diehard Elvis fan, my uncle is a hip-hop and R&B head, my sister listened to Britney Spears, country and boy bands and I was into pop punk, punk rock, metal and just into everything." He indicated that his rapping style was influenced by Kanye West and Bone Thugs-n-Harmony, among others.

Acting career 
In March 2016, Mills made his acting debut in the Netflix original comedy series Flaked.

Reality TV gigs 

In 2019, he co-starred in a spinoff of Catfish: The TV Show called Ghosted: Love Gone Missing, where he teamed up with Bachelorette star Rachel Lindsay to help people find those who have ghosted them and find the real reasons for the sudden disappearance in the ghosted persons life.On April 26, 2022, he joined actress Rahne Jones to host MTV's brand-new docuseries, Help! I’m in a Secret Relationship!  Mills and Jones help individuals in long-term romances find out why they are being hidden from their partner's family and friends.

Personal life 
Mills is heavily tattooed, which includes a full sleeve on one arm and a Bone Thugs-n-Harmony tattoo on his chest, in addition to many others. He also designated the letters "FTH" ("Fuck The Haters", "Forever The Highest") on his forehead, the "O" with a heart behind his left ear representing his sisters name and the word "Patience" tatted on his knuckles. Mills also got the word "Gnarly" tattooed across his stomach at age 18. A couple months after that he gave himself a tattoo.

Early in his career Mills sported large stretched earlobes, but proceeded with lobe reconstruction surgery in 2013.

Discography

Studio albums

Extended plays

Mixtapes
 Leaving Home (2011)
 Thrillionaire (2012)

Singles

Guest appearances

Filmography

References

External links
 Official website of T. Mills
 T. Mills on MySpace
 T. Mills Biography on the Uprising Records website
 

1989 births
Living people
21st-century American male musicians
21st-century American rappers
American male models
American male rappers
American male songwriters
American synth-pop musicians
Columbia Records artists
Lava Records artists
Male models from California
Musicians from Riverside, California
People from Riverside, California
Rappers from California
Republic Records artists
Songwriters from California